Maxwell James Haygarth (born 21 January 2002) is an English professional footballer who plays as a winger or midfielder for NIFL Premiership club Linfield. He is a product of the Manchester United academy and began his senior career with Brentford in 2021.

Career

Manchester United 
A winger or midfielder, Haygarth entered the Manchester United academy at age 9 and progressed to sign a scholarship in 2018. Despite suffering from recurring injury problems, he made appearances for the club's U18 and U23 teams and departed Carrington in January 2021.

Brentford 
On 16 October 2020, Haygarth joined the B team at Championship club Brentford on loan until January 2021. He won his maiden call into the first team squad for a league match against Nottingham Forest on 12 December 2020 and made his debut as a substitute for Emiliano Marcondes late in the 3–1 win. On 4 January 2021, Haygarth transferred to the club on a permanent basis and signed a -year contract, with the option of a further year. He made two FA Cup appearances in January 2021, but was not involved in Brentford's successful 2021 playoff campaign, which clinched promotion to the Premier League.

Haygarth trained with the first-team squad during the 2021–22 pre-season and was named in each matchday squad during the period. His only senior call-up of the 2021–22 regular season came on 20 November 2021, when he remained an unused substitute during a 3–3 Premier League draw with Newcastle United. Following 28 appearances for the B team in just under two seasons with Brentford, Haygarth was released when his contract expired at the end of the 2021–22 season.

Linfield 
Following trials with English Football League clubs Luton Town, Sheffield United, Sheffield Wednesday and Birmingham City, Haygarth joined NIFL Premiership club Linfield on trial in late December 2022. On 7 January 2023, it was announced that he had signed a contract running until the end of the 2022–23 season. One week later, Haygarth was named in the matchday squad for the first time, for a league match against Glenavon. Two minutes after coming on as an 80th-minute substitute for Andrew Clarke, he scored Linfield's final goal in the 6–1 victory.

Style of play 
Haygarth has been described as "a technical operator in the middle of the park or attack, who is capable of making a real impact on matches".

Career statistics

References

External links 

 
 
 Max Haygarth at linfieldfc.com

Living people
English footballers
Brentford F.C. players
2001 births
Association football wingers
Association football midfielders
English Football League players
Footballers from Manchester
Linfield F.C. players
NIFL Premiership players